Roch Carrier  (born 13 May 1937) is a French Canadian novelist and author of "contes" (a very brief form of the short story). He is among the best known Quebec writers in English Canada.

Life

He was born in Sainte-Justine, Quebec, and studied at  Collège St-Louis in New Brunswick, the Université de Montréal in Quebec, and at the Sorbonne, in Paris, France, where he received a doctorate in literature.

From 1994 to 1997, he served as head of the Canada Council. In 1998, he ran as an electoral candidate for the Quebec Liberal Party under Jean Charest, in the riding of Crémazie. He was defeated by 309 votes.

In 1991, he was made an Officer of the Order of Canada. From 1999 to 2004, Carrier was National Librarian of Canada. With Ian E. Wilson, the then National Archivist, he developed the process to unify the National Archive and National Library.

In 1992, Carrier's Prayers of a Very Wise Child (Prières d'un enfant très très sage) won the Stephen Leacock Memorial Medal for Humour.

Carrier championed Jacques Poulin's novel Volkswagen Blues in Canada Reads 2005.

Also involved in theatre (having served as playwright at the Théâtre du Nouveau Monde), Carrier has adapted La guerre, yes sir! and Floralie, où es-tu? for the stage. La guerre, yes sir! was produced as a play in 1970, was performed in English at the Stratford festival, and has been made into a film. Floralie, où es-tu? was performed by Théâtre du Nouveau-Monde in 1974. The trilogy consisting of these two novels and Il est par là, le soleil sold better in English than in French.

A quote from "Le chandail de hockey" ("The Hockey Sweater"), one of Carrier's contes, was reprinted on the back of the Canadian five-dollar bill. The story, about when Carrier was a young boy who orders a Montreal Canadiens sweater from the Eaton's catalogue, but receives a Toronto Maple Leafs jersey instead, is considered by many to be a literary allegory for the linguistic and cultural tensions between English and French Canadians, and is thus considered essential reading for anybody who seeks to understand the complex realities of linguistic and cultural identity in Canada. But it is also a much-beloved children's story in anglophone Canada without such complex overtones as it may have in a broader context. The National Film Board of Canada has made this story into an animated short film, narrated by Carrier in both the French and English versions.

Heartbreaks Along The Road (De l'amour dans la ferraille) is a work of magical realism - he pokes fun at political and religious figures, using ridiculous scenarios, and exaggerated personality characteristics, while telling the story from different characters' points of view.  There are many levels to his satire and his writing is flowery and descriptive.

Sheila Fischman has won various awards for translation of his books into English.

Two schools are named after Roch Carrier: Roch Carrier French Immersion Public School in Woodstock, Ontario, and Roch Carrier Elementary School in Kanata, Ontario.

Roch Carrier was president on the board of directors for the Society for Educational Visits and Exchanges in Canada, or SEVEC from 2008 to 2009. Upon his retirement from the board he was made an Honorary Member of the Society.

Selected works

 Jolis deuils: Petites tragédies pour adults — 1964
 La guerre, yes sir! — 1968 (translated as La Guerre, Yes Sir! — 1970) 
 Floralie, où es-tu ? — 1969 (translated as Floralie, Where Are You? — 1971) 
 Il est par là, le soleil — 1970 (translated as Is It the Sun, Philibert? — 1972)
 Le deux-millième étage — 1973 (translated as They Won't Demolish Me! — 1974)
 Le jardin des délices — 1975 (translated as The Garden of Delights — 1978) 
 Il n'y a pas de pays sans grand-père — 1977 (translated as No Country Without Grandfathers — 1981) 
 Les Enfants du bonhomme dans la lune — 1979 (translated as The Hockey Sweater and other stories — 1979)
 Les voyageurs de l'arc-en-ciel — 1980 illustration & book design by François Olivier
 Céleste bicyclette — 1980 (translated as The Celestial Bicycle)
 La dame qui avait des chaînes aux chevilles — 1981 (translated as Lady with Chains)
 Le cirque noir — 1982
 Ne faites pas mal à l'avenir — 1984
 De l'amour dans la ferraille — 1984 (translated as Heartbreaks Along The Road)
 La fleur et autres personages — 1985
 Un chameau en Jordanie — 1988
 Enfants de la planète — 1989
 L'homme dans le placard — 1991 (translated as The Man in the Closet)
 Le cannot dans les nuages — 1991
 Prières d'un enfant très très sage — 1991 (translated as Prayers of a Very Wise Child)
 Fin — 1994 (translated as The End)
 Petit homme tornade — 1996 (translated as The Lament of Charlie Longsong)
 Prières d'un adolescent très très sage — 1998 (translated as Prayers of a Young Man)
 Une chaise — 1999
 Les moines dans la tour — 2004
 Ma vie avec Maurice Richard (My life with Maurice Richard)
 Montcalm et Wolfe — 2014 (translated as Montcalm and Wolfe by Donald Winkler)

See also

 Canadian literature

References

Further reading
  Manfred Overmann: "Le chandail de Hockey." Didactisation du conte de Roch Carrier et du court métrage animé par Sheldon Cohen, Zeitschrift für Romanische Sprachen und ihre Didaktik, 11.2, ibidem, Stuttgart 2017   pp 106 – 136 (in French)

External links
Roch Carrier in The Canadian Encyclopedia
 
 Roch Carrier at Library and Archives Canada

1937 births
Living people
Canadian librarians
Canadian male novelists
Canadian male short story writers
French Quebecers
University of Paris alumni
Officers of the Order of Canada
Writers from Quebec
Stephen Leacock Award winners
Royal Military College Saint-Jean people
Quebec Liberal Party candidates in Quebec provincial elections
Canadian novelists in French
20th-century Canadian short story writers
21st-century Canadian short story writers
20th-century Canadian novelists
21st-century Canadian novelists
20th-century Canadian male writers
21st-century Canadian male writers
Canadian expatriates in France